Empty Cloud Monastery is a gender-inclusive, non-sectarian Buddhist monastery in West Orange, New Jersey, United States.

Origins 

Empty Cloud Monastery was co-founded in 2019 by Buddhist monks Ayyā Somā and Bhante Suddhāso, supported by their non-profit organization Buddhist Insights. The monastics were initially based out of a meditation center in Rockaway Queens, New York City, but after a number of donations, the organization was able to secure the three-acre, century-old property, which was formerly a Catholic monastery.

Lifestyle 

Empty Cloud Monastery is a gender-inclusive monastery, therefore all of its residents, monastic and lay, practice alongside each other in a community setting, while residing in separate living quarters. The core focus of the monastery is to practice traditional Buddhist teachings while making them available free-of-charge to all those interested, and the monastery regularly hosts retreats and residencies open to the public. Guest monastic teachers are routinely invited to teach, and previous teachers include Bhikkhu Bodhi, Khenmo Drolma, Ajahn Brahm, and other monastics of all genders from various traditions and lineages.

The daily schedule includes Morning puja begins at 5:30 am and lasts an hour and a half. It includes chanting in both Pali and English, then an hour of silent meditation. This is followed by a short chore period and breakfast. At 8 am, there is sutta study, then a two-hour work period, followed by the day's final meal at 11 am. All lay residents follow the Eight Precepts The afternoon is then reserved for personal practice. At 5 pm, tea is served, followed by a Dhamma talk and evening puja at 7:30 pm.

Community programs

Various free meditation programs and retreats are offered at the monastery, both on-site at the monastery, and at various locations nearby.

See also
Buddhism in the United States
Buddhist monasticism
Index of Buddhism-related articles

References

External links
 
 Buddhist Insights' website

Buddhist monasteries in the United States
Buddhist temples in New Jersey